Leptanilla is a genus of ant in the subfamily Leptanillinae. Like other genera in this subfamily, the queen is fed by the hemolymph of their own larvae, which have specialized processes for this purpose.

Biology
Some species form colonies consisting of several hundred workers in the soil. They feed on small arthropods, including centipedes, and are rarely seen because they live underground and rarely come to the surface. In some species the queen is wingless, and new colonies form by budding from established colonies. Others have a nomadic life-style resembling that of army ants.

Description
Leptanilla workers have no eyes, and are pale, yellow, and small.

Distribution
Several species are found in North Africa, S. doderoi and S. revelierei in Corsica and Sardinia, S. havilandi and S. butteli in the Malay Peninsula, S. santschii in Java. S. swani is the only Australian species that has been described.

Species

Leptanilla africana Baroni Urbani, 1977
Leptanilla alexandri Dlussky, 1969
Leptanilla astylina Petersen, 1968
Leptanilla australis Baroni Urbani, 1977
Leptanilla besucheti Baroni Urbani, 1977
Leptanilla bifurcata Kugler, 1987
Leptanilla boltoni Baroni Urbani, 1977
Leptanilla buddhista Baroni Urbani, 1977
Leptanilla butteli Forel, 1913 — Malay Peninsula
Leptanilla charonea Barandica, López, Martínez & Ortuño, 1994
Leptanilla clypeata Yamane & Ito, 2001
Leptanilla doderoi Emery, 1915 — Corsica, Sardinia
Leptanilla escheri (Kutter, 1948)
Leptanilla exigua Santschi, 1908 — North Africa
Leptanilla havilandi Forel, 1901 — Malay Peninsula
Leptanilla hunanensis Tang, Li & Chen, 1992
Leptanilla islamica Baroni Urbani, 1977
Leptanilla israelis Kugler, 1987
Leptanilla japonica Baroni Urbani, 1977
Leptanilla judaica Kugler, 1987
Leptanilla kebunraya Yamane & Ito, 2001
Leptanilla kubotai Baroni Urbani, 1977
Leptanilla kunmingensis Xu & Zhang, 2002
Leptanilla lamellata Bharti & Kumar, 2012
Leptanilla macauensis Leong, Yamane & Guénard, 2018 — Macau
Leptanilla minuscula Santschi, 1907 — North Africa
Leptanilla morimotoi Yasumatsu, 1960
Leptanilla nana Santschi, 1915 — North Africa
Leptanilla oceanica Baroni Urbani, 1977
Leptanilla ortunoi López, Martínez & Barandica, 1994
Leptanilla palauensis (Smith, 1953)
Leptanilla plutonia López, Martínez & Barandica, 1994
Leptanilla poggii Mei, 1995
Leptanilla revelierii Emery, 1870 — Corsica, Sardinia, Morocco
Leptanilla santschii Wheeler & Wheeler, 1930 — Java
Leptanilla swani Wheeler, 1932 — Western Australia
Leptanilla taiwanensis Ogata, Terayama & Masuko, 1995
Leptanilla tanakai Baroni Urbani, 1977
Leptanilla tanit Santschi, 1907
Leptanilla tenuis Santschi, 1907 — North Africa
Leptanilla thai Baroni Urbani, 1977
Leptanilla theryi Forel, 1903 — North Africa
Leptanilla vaucheri Emery, 1899 — North Africa
Leptanilla yunnanensis Xu, 2002
Leptanilla zaballosi Barandica, López, Martínez & Ortuño, 1994

References

External links

Leptanillinae
Ant genera
Taxa named by Carlo Emery